Goz Beïda National Park is a national park in Chad and covers an area of 3000 km2.

It is located near the town of the same name in the province of Sila. The area has been hit by internal conflicts in the country, but it has also remained a haven for many endangered plant and animal species.

References

National parks of Chad